Denstone College is an independent, coeducational boarding school in Denstone,
Staffordshire, England. Its alumni are known as Old Denstonians (ODs). The Denstone Association looks after the College's alumni.

ODs

Peter Brinson – writer and lecturer on dance
Sir Vandeleur Molyneux Grayburn – Chief Manager of the HSBC Bank and member of the Hong Kong Resistance who died a prisoner of the Japanese in 1943
Nigel Grindley FRS - Emeritus Professor in Genetics, Yale University.
Peter Gerald "Spam" Hammersley CB OBE – Rear Admiral, Royal Navy
Frederick George Jackson – Arctic explorer
John Makepeace OBE – furniture designer
Keith Mant – forensic pathologist and war crime investigator
William Whitehead Watts – President of the Geological Society (1910–1912)
Lieutenant General Ralph Wooddisse – British Army officer

Churchmen
Charles Copland – clergyman
Philip Pasterfield – Bishop of Crediton (1974–1984)
Dennis Victor – Bishop of Lebombo

Politicians and lawyers
Geoffrey Cheshire FBA – barrister and jurist
Warren Hawksley – Conservative Member of Parliament
Asda Jayanama – diplomat
Lord Justice Kay – Lord Justice of Appeal

Sportsmen

 Arthur Berry – England footballer, double Olympic gold medallist and former Chairman of Liverpool Football Club
Phil Davies – rugby player
Alastair Hignell – rugby union and cricket player
Harvey Hosein – English cricketer
N. F. Humphreys – 1910 British Lions player (died in World War I)
Tommy Kemp – rugby union fly half for England 1931–1948
Sam Lewis – rugby union lock/flanker for Leicester Tigers
Tim Mason – cricketer
David Short – Derbyshire cricketer
Jeremy Snape – England cricketer
George Stocks – Argentine cricketer
Alex Thomson (cricketer) - cricketer
Ben White – rugby union scrum half for Leicester Tigers

Writers and broadcasters
Quentin Crisp – writer and actor
 René Cutforth – journalist
Alex Lester – broadcaster
Petre Mais (S. P. B. Mais) – author and broadcaster
Tim Marlow – writer, broadcaster and art historian
 Richard Morris – archaeologist and writer
Guy Thorne – pseudonym: Cyril Arthur Edward Justice Waggoner Ranger Gull, (1876–1923), novelist and journalist

See also
:Category:People educated at Denstone College.

References

External links
 Denstone College Website
 Denstone Association

Denstone College

Denstone